Attila Mészáros (born 16 March 1983) is a Hungarian football defender.

References

1983 births
Living people
Hungarian footballers
Budapest Honvéd FC players
Kecskeméti TE players
Fehérvár FC players
FC Dabas footballers
Soroksár SC players
Monori SE players
Nemzeti Bajnokság I players
Association football defenders